Mykola Dementiuk (born 1949) is an American author. A graduate of Columbia University, his work has appeared in Pink Pages, Atom Mind, Paramour, and EIDOS Magazine. He was a member of the road crew for Lollapalooza, the Big Apple Circus, and Cirque du Soleil before being partially incapacitated by a stroke in 1997.

Dementiuk received a Lambda Literary Award in 2010 for his novel Holy Communion, and again in 2013 for The Facialist. His collection Times Square Queer: Tales of Bad Boys in the Big Apple was a finalist for the 2013 Bisexual Book Awards.

Bibliography
Vienna Dolorosa (2007)
Holy Communion (2008)
100 Whores: Memories of a John (2010)
Dee Dee Day (2010)
Variety, the Spice of Life (2010)
Kisser: A Masculine Femininity (2011)
Queers of Central Park (2011)
The Facialist (2012)
Times Square Queer: Tales of Bad Boys in the Big Apple (2012)
Sissy Godiva (2013)
The Bookstore Clerk (2013)

References

External links
Interview with Mykola Dementiuk

21st-century American novelists
American male novelists
Living people
1949 births
Columbia University alumni
Lambda Literary Award winners
American gay writers
American erotica writers
21st-century American male writers